Greenhorn is a census-designated place (CDP) in Plumas County, California, United States. The population was 236 at the 2010 census, up from 146 at the 2000 census.

Geography
Greenhorn is located at  (39.905794, -120.748665).

Demographics

2010
At the 2010 census Greenhorn had a population of 236. The racial makeup of Greenhorn was 213 (90.3%) White, 1 (0.4%) African American, 7 (3.0%) Native American, 2 (0.8%) Asian, 0 (0.0%) Pacific Islander, 6 (2.5%) from other races, and 7 (3.0%) from two or more races. Hispanic or Latino of any race were 22 people (9.3%).

The whole population lived in households, no one lived in non-institutionalized group quarters and no one was institutionalized.

There were 106 households, 23 (21.7%) had children under the age of 18 living in them, 56 (52.8%) were opposite-sex married couples living together, 4 (3.8%) had a female householder with no husband present, 4 (3.8%) had a male householder with no wife present.  There were 7 (6.6%) unmarried opposite-sex partnerships, and 1 (0.9%) same-sex married couples or partnerships. 33 households (31.1%) were one person and 9 (8.5%) had someone living alone who was 65 or older. The average household size was 2.23.  There were 64 families (60.4% of households); the average family size was 2.81.

The age distribution was 43 people (18.2%) under the age of 18, 15 people (6.4%) aged 18 to 24, 47 people (19.9%) aged 25 to 44, 88 people (37.3%) aged 45 to 64, and 43 people (18.2%) who were 65 or older.  The median age was 46.9 years. For every 100 females, there were 96.7 males.  For every 100 females age 18 and over, there were 103.2 males.

There were 140 housing units at an average density of 20.9 per square mile, of the occupied units 95 (89.6%) were owner-occupied and 11 (10.4%) were rented. The homeowner vacancy rate was 6.9%; the rental vacancy rate was 8.3%.  211 people (89.4% of the population) lived in owner-occupied housing units and 25 people (10.6%) lived in rental housing units.

2000
At the 2000 census there were 146 people, 64 households, and 40 families in the CDP. The population density was 21.7 people per square mile (8.4/km2). There were 84 housing units at an average density of 12.5 per square mile (4.8/km2).  The racial makeup of the CDP was 94.52% White, 0.68% Native American, and 4.79% from two or more races. 4.79% of the population were Hispanic or Latino of any race.
Of the 64 households 25.0% had children under the age of 18 living with them, 59.4% were married couples living together, 1.6% had a female householder with no husband present, and 37.5% were non-families. 29.7% of households were one person and 14.1% were one person aged 65 or older. The average household size was 2.28 and the average family size was 2.85.

The age distribution was 23.3% under the age of 18, 3.4% from 18 to 24, 32.9% from 25 to 44, 28.8% from 45 to 64, and 11.6% 65 or older. The median age was 43 years. For every 100 females, there were 114.7 males. For every 100 females age 18 and over, there were 124.0 males.

The median household income was $151,513 and the median family income  was $151,053. Males had a median income of $136,250 versus $14,625 for females. The per capita income for the CDP was $21,525. None of the population and none of the families were below the poverty line.

Politics

References

Census-designated places in Plumas County, California
Populated places in the Sierra Nevada (United States)